Rekonstruktsiya is a rural locality (a settlement) in Mikhaylovka Urban Okrug, Volgograd Oblast, Russia. The population was 1,272 as of 2010. There are 21 streets.

Geography 
Rekonstruktsiya is located 36 km northeast of Mikhaylovka. Troitsky is the nearest rural locality.

References 

Rural localities in Mikhaylovka urban okrug